Romundstad is a village and basic statistical unit (grunnkrets) in the municipality of Rindal in Trøndelag county, Norway.

The settlement lies along the Rinda River and Norwegian County Road 341, also known as Romundstadbygdvegen (Romundstad Village Road). It consists of several farms, including the Flålia, Heggem, Hegglund, Nerbu, Nergård, and Romundstad farms.

The settlement was attested as Romundsta in 1559 (and as Rømundsta in 1590 and Roemundstad in 1643, among other names). The original name is reconstructed as the compound word *Rómundarstaðir which comes from Rómundr (a masculine name) and staðir 'farmstead, dwelling'.

Notable people
Notable people that were born or lived in Romundstad include:
John Neergaard (1795–1885), farmer, bailiff, and politician

References

External links
Romundstad at FINN kart
Romundstad at Norgeskart

Rindal
Villages in Trøndelag